The Million Dollar Duck (also titled as $1,000,000 Duck) is a 1971 American comedy film produced by Walt Disney Productions based on the goose that lays golden eggs scenario. It was directed by Vincent McEveety, and stars Dean Jones, Sandy Duncan and Joe Flynn. The film was released on June 30, 1971, and received negative reviews from critics.

Plot
Scientist Albert Dooley (Dean Jones) struggles to pay the bills. His wife, Katie (Sandy Duncan) gets a recipe for applesauce wrong and gives it to her husband to take to work for lunch, hoping it will help cut down on the budget. In a humorous chain reaction, the duck Albert is testing steals the applesauce after Albert has thrown it away in the trash and then wanders into a radiation lab and becomes irradiated. Albert is ordered to get rid of the duck, so he figures he can give it to his son, Jimmy (Lee Montgomery) who has been wanting a pet, only to discover it now lays eggs with solid gold yolks.

In a Pavlovian manner, the duck, named "Charley" (despite being female), lays an egg when prompted by the barking of a dog. At first, the only ones who know of Charley's golden yolks are Albert, Katie, Jimmy and Albert's friend, Fred, but as they sell the yolks of gold, they gain the attention of a suspicious neighbor, Mr. Hooper (Joe Flynn), a government bureaucrat from the U.S. Treasury Department. Hooper spies on the Dooleys in a haphazard manner, often suffering mishaps such as falling off a tree branch after being yelled at by his wife to leave the neighbors alone. However, Hooper sees a golden yolk laid firsthand, with Fred and Albert celebrating.

Hooper warns his boss Rutledge (James Gregory) about the economic upheaval. Although Rutledge doesn't believe Hooper at first, a series of nationwide phone calls among politicians spreads rumors, culminating in Rutledge getting a phone call from President Nixon ordering him to capture the duck. Albert becomes greedy and no longer cares for his son, which saddens Jimmy. The Treasury Department officials (with Mr. Hooper) soon arrive at the house and order the family to turn over the duck. Jimmy, watching from upstairs, climbs out the window with Charley and then rides off with a couple of teenage boys and their hot rod as the government officials try to seize Charley.

Jimmy is then suspended on a ladder between two parking garages and Albert attempts to convince his son to grab his hand before the ladder falls. Jimmy tells his dad to go away, believing he only wants to save Charley, but when the ladder begins to break, he grows fearful and realizes that his dad is there to help. Right before the ladder falls, Albert saves Jimmy. Immediately afterwards, Albert is arrested for owning gold as a private citizen. The family ends up in court and the judge breaks an egg into a glass after Mr. Hooper (unsuccessfully) and then Albert (successfully) barks at the duck to prompt the laying of the egg, which surprisingly turns out to be an ordinary egg yolk, as the effects of the radiation had worn off. The judge dismisses the charges, as there is no proof of the duck laying golden eggs, and Albert tells the family that the golden duck was nice while it lasted, but at least they can keep the duck for their pet, now realizing that his family is more important than wealth. The judge remarks to Jimmy, "If that duck ever lays another golden egg...bury it quick!"

Cast

Dean Jones as Albert Dooley
Sandy Duncan as Katie Dooley
Joe Flynn as Finley Hooper
Tony Roberts as Fred Hines
James Gregory as Rutledge
Lee Montgomery as Jimmy Dooley
Jack Kruschen as Doctor Gottlieb
Virginia Vincent as Eunice Hooper
Jack Bender as Arvin Wadlow
Billy Bowles as Orlo Wadlow 
Sammy Jackson as Frisby
Arthur Hunnicutt as Mr. Purdham 
Frank Wilcox as Bank Manager
Bryan O'Byrne as Bank Teller
Ted Jordan as Mr. Forbes
Bing Russell as Mr. Smith
Peter Renaday as Mr. Beckert
Frank Cady as Assayer
George O'Hanlon as Parking Attendant 
Jonathan Daly as Carter
Hal Smith as Courthouse Guard
Edward Andrews as Morgan

Reception
The Million Dollar Duck was one of three movies that film critic Gene Siskel walked out on during his professional career, the other two being the 1980 horror film Maniac and the 1996 comedy film Black Sheep. Roger Ebert described the film as "one of the most profoundly stupid movies I've ever seen". Scott Weinberg of DVD Talk criticised the depiction of Duncan's character, stating "Sandy Duncan...is asked to play a housewife who's easily as stupid as a stone. Throughout the entire flick she's about two steps up from mental retardation. And this stuff is played for laughs!" He also called Million Dollar Duck "easily one of the Disney studio's very worst live-action family comedies. Ever". Revisionist critics have been less harsh on the film, understanding its targeted appeal was to children and getting into the spirit of the essential silliness of the premise of an extremely valuable duck.  Despite poor reviews for the film, the comedic acting was appreciated at the time of its release with both Sandy Duncan and Dean Jones being nominated for Golden Globes for their performances.  The film also marked the motion picture debut of Tony Roberts, who received solid reviews for his performance.

On Rotten Tomatoes, the movie has an approval rating of 17% rating based on 6 reviews and an average rating of 3.5/10. On Metacritic the film has a weighted average score of 45 out of 100, based on 4 critics, indicating "Mixed or average reviews".

See also
 List of American films of 1971

References

External links

  
 
 

1971 films
1970s English-language films
1971 comedy films
American children's comedy films
Walt Disney Pictures films
Films directed by Vincent McEveety
Films scored by Paul Smith (film and television composer)
Films scored by Buddy Baker (composer)
Films about ducks
Films based on Aesop's Fables
Fairy tale parody films
1970s American films
Films set in the United States